Our Man in Marrakesh (released in North America as Bang! Bang! You're Dead!) is a 1966 British comedy spy film shot in Morocco produced and co-written by Harry Alan Towers,  directed by Don Sharp and starring Tony Randall, Herbert Lom and Senta Berger.

Plot
One of six travellers who catch the bus from Casablanca airport to Marrakesh is carrying $2 million to pay a powerful local man (Herbert Lom) to fix United Nations votes on behalf of an unnamed nation. But not even the powerful man knows which of them it is - and his background checks reveal that at least three of them aren't who they claim to be. As agents from other nations may be among them, he and his henchmen have to be very careful until the courier chooses to reveal himself - or herself...

Main cast

 Tony Randall as Andrew Jessel
 Senta Berger as Kyra Stanovy
 Terry-Thomas as El Caid
 Herbert Lom as Mr Casimir
 Wilfrid Hyde-White as Arthur Fairbrother
 Grégoire Aslan as Achmed
 John Le Mesurier as George Lillywhite
 Klaus Kinski as Jonquil
 Margaret Lee as Samia Voss
 Emile Stemmler as Hotel clerk
 Helen Sanguinetti as Madame Bouseny
 Francisco Sánchez as Martinez
 William Sanguinetti as Police chief
 Hassan Essakali as Motorcycle policeman
 Keith Peacock as Philippe
 Burt Kwouk as the Import Manager

Production
Writer Yeldham and director Sharp were both Australians who worked several times with Harry Alan Towers. Sharp said "it had a cast which showed you where the money had come from." The film was shot in Morocco using "frozen" funds owed to Warner Bros. Sharp says just before filming started Warner's revealed that the exchange rate meant their funds would not cover the cost for the whole film so Towers had to scramble to raise additional financing. This involved Towers arranging for suitcases of cash to be smuggled into the country.

Reception
Our Man in Marrakesh opened in London on 5 May 1966, the same day as A Man Could Get Killed and the day before Modesty Blaise. This caused the critic in The Times to write a combined review titled "Humorous variations on theme of the secret agent", where Our Man in Marrakesh is noted for having a story similar to A Man Could Get Killed, but comparatively lacking in wit. However, the film gets some credit for a colourful chase through Marrakesh's dyers' quarter.

References

External links
 
 
 
 
 Review of film at Cinema Retro

1966 films
British spy comedy films
1960s English-language films
British action comedy films
1960s spy comedy films
Films set in Morocco
Films shot in Morocco
Films directed by Don Sharp
Films scored by Malcolm Lockyer
Films about vacationing
1960s action comedy films
1966 comedy films
American International Pictures films
1960s British films